Experience and education may refer to:

 experiential education, a philosophy of education
 Experience and Education (book), by John Dewey the most famous proponent of this philosophy
 Experience & Education, an album by Sadat X